Slatenik is a small dispersed settlement in the Municipality of Pesnica in northeastern Slovenia. It lies in the Slovene Hills north of the local road from Vosek to Spodnji Jakobski Dol. The area is part of the traditional region of Styria. The municipality is now included in the Drava Statistical Region.

References

External links
Slatenik on Geopedia

Populated places in the Municipality of Pesnica